Mohammad Bandar Al-Shalhoub (born 8 December 1980) is a Saudi Arabian former footballer who played as an attacking midfielder for Al Hilal in the Saudi Professional League. A legend of Saudi football, he won 33 trophies with Al Hilal and one title with the Saudi Arabia national team, making him one of the most decorated footballers of all time.

On 30 November 2006, Al-Shalhoub came third in the Asian Footballer of the Year award, after eventual winner Khalfan Ibrahim from Qatar and Bader Al-Mutawa from Kuwait.

Club career
Al-Shalhoub started his professional career with Al Hilal in 1998. On 11 September 2020, he announced his retirement.

Club statistics

 Assist Goals

International career
He has been a member of the Saudi Arabia national team since 2000 when he was just twenty years old, and made his debut on 17 October 2000 against Qatar in the 2000 AFC Asian Cup. Al-Shalhoub was called up for the squad to participate in the 2006 FIFA World Cup.

International caps

International goals
Scores and results list Saudi Arabia's goal tally first.

Honours

Clubs
Al-Hilal
 Saudi League (8): 2002, 2005, 2008, 2010, 2011,  2017, 2018, 2020
 Crown Prince Cup (11): 2000, 2003, 2005, 2006, 2008, 2009, 2010, 2011, 2012, 2013, 2016
 King Cup of Champions (3): 2015, 2017 , 2020 .
 Saudi Super Cup (2): 2015, 2018 
 Saudi Federation cup (3): 2000, 2005, 2006
 AFC Champions League (2): 2000, 2019
 Asian Cup Winners Cup (1): 2002
 Asian Super Cup (1): 2000
 Saudi Founder's Cup (1): 2000
 Arab Cup Winners' Cup (1): 2001
 Saudi-Egyptian Super Cup (1): 2001

International
Gulf Cup of Nations (1): 2003

Individual
 Saudi Premier League top goalscorer: 2009–10 (12 goals)
 Asian Footballer of the Year nominee: 2006

See also
 List of men's footballers with 100 or more international caps
 List of one-club men in association football

References

External links

1980 births
Living people
Saudi Arabian footballers
Saudi Arabia international footballers
2000 AFC Asian Cup players
2002 FIFA World Cup players
2004 AFC Asian Cup players
2006 FIFA World Cup players
2011 AFC Asian Cup players
Al Hilal SFC players
FIFA Century Club
Sportspeople from Riyadh
Saudi Professional League players
Association football midfielders
Association football wingers